Ectoedemia occultella, the small birch leafminer, is a moth of the family Nepticulidae. It has a Holarctic distribution. It is found in most of Europe, east through Russia (where it has been recorded from Murmansk, Karelia, Leningrad, Samara and Tatarstan and Sakhalin) to Japan. It is also present in North America. Mines very similar to that of Ectoedemia occultella have been found on Rosaceae species in Nepal and Japan and these may belong to this species.

The wingspan is 5–7 mm. The head is grey, the face whitish. Forewings are light grey irrorated with dark fuscous and with a very indistinct oblique whitish fascia before middle, usually partly or wholly obsolete ; a small tornal spot and larger triangular spot on costa somewhat beyond it ochreous-white. Hindwings grey. Adults are on wing from May to July.

The larvae feed on Betula ermani, Betula grossa, Betula humilis, Betula nana, Betula obscura, Betula pendula and Betula pubescens. It has also been recorded from Salix pentandra in Finland. They mine the leaves of their host plant. The mine consists of a round, primary, upper-surface blotch without a visible initial corridor. There are often several mines in one leaf. The mine has a dark centre, where the larva often retreats.

References

External links

 Plant Parasites of Europe
Nepticulidae from the Volga and Ural region
Ectoedemia occultella at UKMoths
Swedish moths
Ectoedemia occultella images at  Consortium for the Barcode of Life

Nepticulidae
Moths of Asia
Moths of Europe
Moths of North America
Taxa named by Carl Linnaeus
Moths described in 1767